International Steel can refer to:

International Steel Company, a defunct Evansville, Indiana company, or
International Steel Group, a defunct Cleveland, Ohio company